Moonidih is an inhabited place in Dhanbad CD block in Dhanbad Sadar subdivision of Dhanbad district in the Indian state of Jharkhand

Geography

Location

Note: The map alongside presents some of the notable locations in the area. All places marked in the map are linked in the larger full screen map.

Moonidih was not identified as a separate place in 2011 census. In the map of Dhanbad cum Kenduadih cum Jogta CD block on page 127 of District Census Handbook Dhanbad, 2011 census, several census towns and mouzas are shown in the southern part of the CD block. It appears that Moonidih is part of a mouza, but it is not possible to identify which one. In the map placed on this page (based on geographical coordinates) Moonidh is surrounded by several census towns in Dhanbad CD block. In the map on this page Kenduadih, a neighbourhood in ward no. 12 of Dhanbad Municipal Corporation, is shown as being adjacent to Moonidih, but the latter is not mentioned in the list of wards in DMC.

Overview
The region shown in the map is a part of the undulating uplands bustling with coalmines. The Damodar River, the most important river of the Chota Nagpur Plateau, flows along the southern border. A major part of the area shown in the map is part of Dhanbad Municipal Corporation, an urban area. The places in the DMC area are marked as neighbourhoods. The western part of the region shown in the map is covered by Dhanbad (community development block). 57% of the population of Dhanbad CD block reside in rural areas and 43% reside in urban areas, The east-central part of the region shown in the map is covered by Baliapur (community development block). 86% of the population of Baliapur CD block reside in rural areas and 14% reside in urban areas. The places in the CD block areas are marked mostly as census towns. Three operational areas of BCCL operate fully within the region – Pootkee Balihari Area, Lodna Area and Eastern Jharia Area. The Moonidih sector of Western Jharia Area also operates in the region.

Economy

Coal mines
The Western Jharia Area of BCCL covers two separate coal blocks- Moonidih coal block and Mahuda coal block. While Moonidih coal block is situated in west-central Jharia coalfield, Mahuda coal basin is situated on the western part of Jharia coalfield. Location wise both the blocks are separated by a few kilometres and are accessible by National Highway 18 (old number NH 32) (locally popular as Dhanbad- Bokaro national highway). The mines in the Area are: Moonidih Project, Murlidih 21/22 pits mine, Lohapatti mine and Bhatdih Mine. The Area office is located at Mahuda.

Since inception Moonidih was designed for high levels of production utilising longwall mechanisation, moving on to higher levels of technology in subsequent years. 

The effectively recovered methane gas is utilised at Moonidih for generating electricity.

Washery
Moonidih coking coal washery of BCCL was commissioned in 1983 and has an operable capacity of 1.60 million tonnes per year.

Transport

Trekkers and mini buses and state buses are available, which connect Moonidih to Jharia, Dhanbad and other places. Public transport buses are few.

The nearest railway station to Moonidih is 8 km away at Mahuda. A branch line for transportation of goods connects Moonidih coal mine and coal washery to Mahuda railway junction. Monnidih is 8 km from Jharia, 10 km from Dhanbad, other nearby villages and mines are at Lodna (6.4 km), Putki (2.5 km), Jamadoba (6.2 km). The Damodar River flows near Moonidih village.

Education
D.A.V. Public School (Moonidih Project), Indian School of Learning, Baludih Public School, Jatudih, are the schools which caters the need of children of villages and staff working in coal mines and washery.

D.A.V. Public School (Moonidih Project) is the largest school in Moonidih on the basis of both, number of students studying and infrastructure.

References

External links
 BCCL Official Website
 Coal India Limited
 DAV Moonidih

Villages in Dhanbad district
Mining communities in Jharkhand